Nam Shan Tung is a village of in the Sai Kung North area of Tai Po District, Hong Kong.

Administration
Nam Shan Tung is a recognized village under the New Territories Small House Policy.

References

External links
 Delineation of area of existing village Nam Shan Tung (Sai Kung North) for election of resident representative (2019 to 2022)

Villages in Tai Po District, Hong Kong